Claverton is a former civil parish, now in the parish of Eaton and Eccleston, in the borough of Cheshire West and Chester and ceremonial county of Cheshire in England. In 2001 it had a population of 7. The parish included the site of The King's School. The civil parish was abolished in 2015 to form Eaton and Eccleston. 

In 1086, Claverton was recorded in the Domesday Book as Cleventone. The landowner was Hugh FitzOsbern. 
With a population of 21 households, it was amongst the largest 40% of settlements recorded in the census.

Throughout the nineteenth century the population was recorded as 0. 
The Imperial Gazetteer of England and Wales described Claverton as "an uninhabited extra-parochial tract in Great Boughton district".

Notes

References

External links

Former civil parishes in Cheshire
Cheshire West and Chester